The Edens Zero manga series features an extensive cast of characters created by Hiro Mashima. The characters consist mainly of humans, robots, and aliens, the majority of which inhabit the "Sakura Cosmos".

Described as a "space fantasy" series by Mashima, Edens Zero depicts several characters that use a magic-like technique called  to harness their bodies' Ether – a magical power source – like the machines of their universe. Other characters include , which are users of an online video platform based on YouTube, and cyborgs, alternatively called  in the series.

Critics and readers have compared the characters' designs and attributes to those from Mashima's earlier series Fairy Tail, some of which they noted were intentionally derivative.

Creation and conception
When developing Edens Zero, author Hiro Mashima wrote several characters' storylines to tie closely to the foundation of the story, which Mashima stated would "almost never change mid-series", amidst those he introduced and changed during the story's progression; he described his storytelling method as falling "somewhere in between" his previous works Rave Master, whose stories and characters he had largely worked out by the series' midway point, and Fairy Tail, where the only predetermined aspect was the backstory of protagonist Natsu Dragneel. Mashima's writing approach led him to include new characters to the main cast who were not originally planned to be, while several planned characters such as Homura and the Four Shining Stars were introduced earlier than intended, resulting in a majority of female characters joining the main cast over male characters.

A number of characters are modeled after characters from Rave Master and Fairy Tail, including Happy, Elsie Crimson (Erza Scarlet), and Justice (Sieg Hart and Jellal Fernandes). Plue, another recurring character in Mashima's manga who featured prominently in Rave Master, makes a minor appearance as well. The manga also includes fictionalized versions of YouTubers whom Mashima has met.

When discussing the series' villains, Mashima stated that his personal theme for Edens Zero was to make them "the absolute worst kind of trash possible" so that readers could look forward to their downfalls. He was influenced to do so after receiving comments from those who sympathized with villains that he intended to be "real [pieces] of garbage" in his previous works. He added that the villains would also have their own convictions leading them to battle the protagonists.

For the story's three-year ellipsis in its second half, Mashima deliberately gave minor visual changes to most of the characters' designs apart from Shiki, whom he wanted to "stand out"; he added that, apart from Hermit and Jinn's designs, there "wasn't really any thought" put into these changes.

Edens Zero crew
The primary characters of the series are the crew of the  – Edens being an acronym for "Ether Drive Eternal Navigation System" – an interstellar warship left by Ziggy as inheritance to his adoptive grandson, Shiki. The crew's goal is to navigate the universe in search of Mother, both to prove her existence and have their wishes granted by her; as the story progresses, the crew's priorities change to defeating Ziggy after he resurrects as their enemy.

In the story's second half, the Edens Zero is revealed to have come from 20,000 years in the future of Universe 3173, a parallel universe where androids suffer an Ether shortage due to humankind's extinction and Mother's ensuing disappearance; to prevent this, the ship was built on the planet Eden for Ziggy to travel to Universe Zero, a temporal convergence point that influences all other universes in the multiverse. The ship is capable of traveling through time via , an amplified extract of Ether from Rebecca's corpse made after she and Shiki were sent forward in time by a spacetime distortion on the planet Nero 66.

Shiki Granbell

 is the sole human denizen of Granbell, a robot-inhabited theme park planet. Shiki uses the Ether Gear  to freely manipulate gravity for himself and others, a power learned from his surrogate grandfather, Ziggy, who found him on a voyage for Mother beyond the Sakura Cosmos. He is characterized by his obsession with making friends, as well as a paralyzing fear of bugs. After Granbell's dying robot community chases him away with Rebecca to save him from solitude on their planet, Shiki searches for Mother to fulfill his goal of making 100 new friends across the universe. In the process, he receives the Edens Zero from Elsie Crimson and inherits Ziggy's title of "Demon King" as the ship's captain. During the series' second half, he gains a more serious and mature personality over a three-year period of fighting a resurrected, evil Ziggy in Universe 3, where Shiki is branded as one of the Oración Seis Galáctica for his growing power and vigilantism.

Continuing his theme of naming protagonists after seasons, Mashima chose the Japanese word meaning  for the main character of Edens Zero to represent the culmination of his previous works. Mashima wrote that he often forgets to draw details of the character such as the patch on his cheek, and that he alternated between design attributes during development, such as giving him white hair instead of the final black, and whether or not Shiki would wear goggles. Other concept drawings depict Shiki wearing a bracelet that transforms into a gauntlet as an early concept for his Ether Gear. Although the character's transition into a young man was planned early in development, Mashima hesitated to incorporate the change due to concerns of negative reactions from "fans of the boyishly cute Shiki"; he left traces of his old design to alleviate this, describing the change as "shifting him from cute to cool".

Rebecca Bluegarden

Rebecca becomes Shiki's first human friend after he rescues her from a staged uprising by his robot friends, accompanying him in his search for Mother to attain one million subscribers for her  account, which suffers from low viewership due to poor-quality content. She is an expert markswoman who acquired her skills from playing first-person shooter video games. After stimulating her Ether through repeated baths in the Edens Zero's spa, Rebecca develops her own Ether Gear called , which enhances her jumping power and agility, and allows her to rewind time and mentally "leap" into parallel universes at different points in time.

Mashima developed the heroine character of Edens Zero before giving her a name, developing a variety of hairstyles and outfits before settling on the final design. The name "Rebecca" is taken from the Japanese band of the same name, drawing inspiration from their song "Friends" to compliment Shiki's personality.

Happy

 is Rebecca's best friend and partner, based on the character of the same name from Fairy Tail. He is a feline alien from the planet Excede who was fatally injured in a traffic accident during Rebecca's childhood, leading their benefactor, Professor Weisz, to transfer Happy's mind into an identical android body to help him survive. Happy can transform into a pair of firearms called , which fire non-lethal Ether bullets. He loses his mechanical abilities in Universe Zero, where he never experiences his accident and remains flesh and blood.

Weisz Steiner

 is a man from the planet Norma who practices the Ether Gear , which allows him to instantly remodel machines to improve their performance, deconstruct them, and create weapons. As a result of Weisz fleeing Norma before a chronophage rewinds fifty years of its history, there are two alternate versions of him that co-exist as separate people: his adolescent self, an amoral but good-natured criminal who joins the crew after betraying his gang's leader, ; and his elderly, present-day self, who has since matured into an esteemed robotics professor. During the crew's travels, the young Weisz assumes a superhero identity named , using a powered exoskeleton that he customizes with his Machina Maker.

Mashima described Weisz as "one of the good guys, but still a scumbag", which he noted is an uncommon character type among his works. He also said that Weisz's role in the story was "pretty clearly laid out", which made it "fairly easy to get [him] to do what I want". His name is derived from the word "wise".

E.M. Pino

 is a miniature "anti-bot" android who generates an electromagnetic pulse (EMP) that disables machinery and Ether Gear within range for short periods of time. She joins Shiki after assigning him as her new master, later desiring to be reborn as a human through Mother. During the crew's battle with Ziggy on Lendard, he restores Pino's memory while struggling against the Edens One's control, which allows her to fulfill her purpose of freeing him through her ability to Overdrive.

Mashima created Pino to serve as the mascot character of the series, but during development of the manga, he found it increasingly difficult to include her within the first chapter, where he incorporated Happy to stand in for her. As with Weisz, Mashima said that he found it "fairly easy" to write for Pino due to her established role in the story. He later called Pino his favorite character in the series, adding that he worked out "a lot" of story details for her, and that she would "probably" become an important character. Her name comes from Mashima's attempt to make the term "EMP" sound "cute".

Homura Kôgetsu

 is a young swordswoman from Oedo, a planet styled after Edo period Japan. She uses the Ether Gear  to create swords and other bladed weapons made of solid Ether. Homura joins the crew to search for Valkyrie, her childhood mentor and guardian, whom she regards as a mother figure after being abandoned ten years earlier by her biological mother, Madame Kurenai; due to encouragement from Valkyrie to overcome her previously shy and quiet nature, Homura has the habit of voicing her thoughts and intentions by mistake.

Mashima chose the character's name, which means , to give an impression of the color red and fire.

Demon King's Four Shining Stars
The  are a group of female androids created by Ziggy to serve aboard the Edens Zero. Its members possess functions and powers that improve the ship's travel capacity, with all four required to authorize the use of Etherion. Each android also possesses a  that enhances her combat skills. One of the androids, Valkyrie, is replaced by the human Homura after being discovered dead on the planet Sun Jewel.

Witch Regret

Witch is portrayed as kind and gentle, but becoming ruthless towards those who threaten her crewmates. She sacrifices herself in Universe 3 to protect the crew when Ziggy attempts to destroy them with Shura's antimatter bombs; this is undone when the crew travel to Universe Zero's past, where they relive their first encounter with her.

Sister Ivry

Her  ability allows her to heal wounds, cure afflictions, and repair "living" machines such as herself and other androids. Sister is described as "scary" and "foul-mouthed", and uses the masculine pronoun ore in Japanese.

When talking about Sister's full name, Mashima said that it had no particular meaning, choosing it because he "liked the sound of it".

Hermit Mio

 is a programmer and hacker with the appearance and behavior of a young tsundere girl. When first introduced, Hermit despises humans after being cruelly exploited and experimented upon by the mad scientist  fifteen years earlier, leading her to isolate her mind within the virtual planet Digitalis. Initially rejecting Shiki's friendship, she overcomes her mistrust when the crew's kindness rekindles her desire for human friends, regaining her more cheerful personality.

Mashima originally named the character  in her profile, but changed it after realizing he had already used the name for another character in the manga. He derived the name "Mio" from the Japanese word , which is used in waka as a pun on the phrase , something that Mashima felt reflected her personality. When redesigning the character for the three-year time skip, Mashima changed Hermit's hairstyle due to her resemblance to Hatsune Miku, which he stated was not intentional.

Valkyrie Yuna

 is the "Sword of Edens" from Ziggy's original crew, serving as Homura's guardian and Soul Blade mentor ten years earlier. Valkyrie left Homura five years into her training due to prejudice faced on Oedo for their human-machine relationship, prompting Valkyrie to find Homura's biological mother, Kurenai. After taking Kurenai's place in slavery on Sun Jewel, Valkyrie was betrayed by Kurenai and perished while defending the other slave workers from a horde of monsters unleashed onto them. Following the crew's discovery of Valkyrie's death, Homura allows her remains to be enshrined on the planet and names herself as Valkyrie's successor.

Mashima chose the character's full name because he wanted her to be "a darker-skinned character with a classically Japanese name".

Other crew members

Mosco Versa-0

 is a white-colored sumo android who works aboard the Edens Zero as its caretaker and Sister's verbally abused servant. Debuting as a member of Rogue Out who is reprogrammed to follow Sister's imposter, Mosco resumes his original duties after the real Sister restores him. He specializes in tsuppari techniques, which also allow him to achieve flight. He also has a button with an unknown function on his belly that Sister forbids anyone from pressing.

Mashima did not originally plan to include Mosco in the Edens Zero crew, making the decision after he "took a liking" to the character while drawing him. The author based Mosco's name on the character's predetermined catchphrase, which comes from the sumo term dosukoi.

Connor

 is a spaceship captain from the Aoi Cosmos. Connor appears as a pompous and eccentric middle-aged man with expert piloting skills, using unorthodox methods to push ships beyond their usual capabilities. As the story transitions through different universes, the crew meets alternate versions of Connor that only Rebecca remembers: the original Connor from Universe 1 is the Edens One's shipwrecked captain whom the Zero crew rescues en route to Sun Jewel; in Universe 2, he is a reluctant servant of Ziggy who is hired as the One's pilot; and in Universe 3, he is an escaped worker from Ziggy's robot factory on Lendard who has no knowledge of the One. Connor is later revealed to be Rebecca's father, whose wife, Rachel, left him with their newborn daughter to protect him from being killed her sect, the Church of Saintfire, for their forbidden marriage. Universe 3's version of Connor joins the Zero crew upon discovering his relationship with Rebecca, and reunites with his family after Ziggy's defeat.

The character's design underwent multiple changes during development, all depicting him as thinner and more attractive than the finished version as an overweight old man, with different hairstyles varying from a receding hairline to "silky smooth" hair. After storyboarding Connor's debut appearance, Mashima received input from his editor that Connor's feats were "not very interesting" for a "good-looking" character to perform. According to Mashima, the current design received complaints from his female staff over the change.

Jinn

Jinn uses the Ether Gear  to perform ninjutsu techniques that produce winds with typhoon-like force. His body is 60% mechanized due to a childhood incident where Müller orphaned and dismembered him in front of his younger sister, Kleene, as revenge against their parents for withdrawing their financial support. Jinn seeks Sister out to cure Kleene's trauma from the incident, which allows Rogue Out's leader to deceive him by impersonating Sister until he kills the imposter upon her exposure. He boards the Edens Zero after gaining the real Sister's cooperation while serving Drakken Joe, remaining distant from the crew until Sister successfully treats Kleene.

The code name "Jinn" is taken from the wind spirit of the same name. Mashima gave the character "a lot more hair" to make him easier to draw during the series' second half, citing difficulties of drawing him consistently in the first half.

Kleene Rutherford

Her Ether Gear, creates air currents that are capable of stealing objects, redirecting projectiles, and trapping people in wind cages. Kleene suffers from mental breakdowns whenever she experiences any emotion, caused by a repressed memory of Müller forcing her to watch Jinn's dismemberment during their childhood, which requires her to wear emotion-suppressing devices on her head that also indicate her mood. She joins the crew with Jinn after Sister cures her condition by erasing her traumatic memories.

Laguna Husert

 is a cross-dressing man who uses the water-manipulation Ether Gear , which he combines with Empire Ether to transform others into water whenever they cry. Laguna is depicted as a former stage actor who retired following his best friend's death in a raid by the Nero Empire, realizing his own inability to cry naturally due to his over-commitment to his roles. He first appears as the Element 4's representative of water under Drakken Joe, but is inducted into the Edens Zero crew by Witch after proving himself to be among Drakken's more humane minions. He later reveals himself to be an estranged member of the anti-imperial rebel army , which he deserted to gain more power against Poseidon Nero.

Couchpo

First meeting Rebecca when they and several other  are abducted by Rogue Out, Couchpo joins the crew during another encounter on the planet Foresta after being enamored with the ship's kitchen, and provides critiques that help bolster Rebecca's popularity.

Edens One crew
The  is a more technologically advanced version of the Edens Zero, which serves as its prototype. It is captained by Connor in Universe 1 and Universe 2, parallel universes to where Rebecca travels. Originally destroyed in Universe 1 prior to the Zero crew's voyage to Sun Jewel, the undamaged ship is placed under Ziggy's command in subsequent universes, with the ship's crew becoming the primary antagonistic group faced by the Zero crew. Following Ziggy's destruction, the One is revealed to be artificially intelligent and the true main antagonist of the series, having controlled Ziggy to carry out its will to destroy Mother and humankind.

When speaking about the development of the Edens One, Mashima stated that he settled on the details surrounding the ship "to a degree" upon its first mention in the story, adding that the remaining details would be implemented later during the storyboarding process.

Ziggy
Introduced as a good and kind figure who broke down from old age ten years before the series' beginning, Ziggy discovered Shiki on a failed voyage for Mother aboard the Edens Zero, raising him to use his own gravity abilities. During his and Shiki's final battle on Lendard, Ziggy reveals himself to be a mechanized version of Shiki from Universe 3173, where he was sent 20,000 years into the future by a spacetime distortion on Nero 66 before using Etherion to travel to the past, gaining amnesia in the process. Furthermore, his evil behavior is revealed to be a result of the Edens One's AI taking control of him. After Pino restores Ziggy's original personality, Shiki destroys him at Ziggy's own request to prevent the One from controlling him again.

Mashima named the character after the song "Ziggy Stardust" by singer David Bowie, which the author listened to frequently during the manga's production; the name "Ziggy" was originally given to Shiki in the story's earliest draft. Mashima noted that several readers were able to predict the character's backstory before it was revealed, although he stated that there would be "at least one" element to surprise readers due to the backstory's "complex" nature.

Demon King's Four Dark Stars
The  are a group of male androids created by Ziggy as the "superior" successors to the Four Shining Stars. During their battle with the Edens Zero crew on Lendard, the Dark Stars are revealed to be acquaintances of their respective Shining Star counterparts, having had their memories of these encounters erased before Ziggy's retirement.

He is also able to absorb others' Ether to amplify his own power.
When wearing his Battle Dress, he transports others to a subconscious world where he afflicts them with traumatic nightmares.
Initially having a faceless appearance, he is rebuilt with his original humanoid form after being nearly destroyed by Jaguar.
After Jaguar heavily damages him, he is rebuilt and dedicates himself to defeating Homura, Valkyrie's heir.

Oración Seis Galáctica
The Oración Seis Galáctica (Spanish for "Galactic Prayer Six") – known in Japanese as  – are a group of six powerful outlaws who are described as being capable of "crushing" planets. Their membership changes over the course of the story, with the Interstellar Union Army branding Shiki and Ziggy as members in Universe 3.

Elsie Crimson

Elsie practices the Ether Gear , which absorbs planetary Ether and converts it into battle gear or energy attacks. Born as a princess of the Kaede Cosmos planet Lendard named , she was sheltered by Ziggy's crew during her childhood after unintentionally causing a civil war while opposing her parents' corruption, orphaning herself and her arranged fiancé, Justice. Elsie delivers the Edens Zero to Shiki on behalf of Ziggy, who entrusted it to her after disbanding his crew. During the battle against Ziggy on Lendard, Elsie re-experiences her guilt over inciting the war and reconciles with Justice, with both allowing a chronophage to consume them along with 260 years of Lendard's history, erasing them from existence.

Mashima commented on her and Justice's relationship, which he described as "a very star-crossed destiny".

Drakken Joe

, named by Mashima after the video game Drakkhen, is a loan shark who controls the Sakura Cosmos's criminal underworld. His base is the space fortress , which contains a city sector of the planet Guilst and is significantly inhabited by his debtors. Raised as a test subject with a fifteen-year life expectancy, Drakken has sustained his youth for over 200 years with a life-support machine that steals countless people's life force, but also deteriorates his physical health. He targets the Edens Zero to extract Rebecca's Ether Gear for himself, viewing her mental time travel ability as a more efficient means of immortality. Following an encounter with Drakken that results in Shiki's death, Rebecca escapes to a parallel universe where the crew is able to reverse his life-support system and defeat him, aging him into a feeble old man.

Element 4
The  are Drakken's special forces unit, whose members each use Ether Gear with power over one of the classical elements, maintaining the balance of Drakken's Ether due to his unnaturally advanced age. Laguna and Kleene begin as members of team, representing water and wind, respectively, with Jinn hired as Kleene's assistant.

  is a long-range sniper who represents fire in the Element 4, using the Ether Gear  to ignite his bullets.
  is an alien and torture addict who represents earth in the Element 4. His Ether Gear, inflicts torture by growing branches inside people's bodies.

Poseidon Nero
He also uses the Ether Gear  to create portals that instantly transport himself and others to different locations. He allows the empire to fall as compensation for victory against Ziggy, his former friend, but is killed after Ziggy destroys the dice and absorbs his Ether Gear.

Poseidon Shura
 is Nero's adoptive human son and heir, and a gravity Ether Gear user whom Ziggy briefly tutored before discovering Shiki. Shura specializes in manipulating the gravity of objects in addition to his own, as opposed to Shiki's greater focus on personal gravity. He becomes a personal adversary to Shiki after the latter spurns Shura's offer of friendship. Shura is killed on Nero 66 when Ziggy destroys the planet with Nero's supply of 20,000 anti-matter bombs in a failed attempt to create the time loop that would transform Shiki into Ziggy.

Oceans 6
 is the empire's special forces team, consisting of six warriors selected by Nero. Its four younger members are Empire Ether users; these characters were included as winning entries of an official character design contest held on Twitter between September 26 and October 31, 2020.

  is Jinn's childhood rival from the Skymech dojo on Guilst. He uses the Ether Gear  to control mist and disintegrate his opponents.
  is a card player who uses the Ether Gear  to attack with playing cards and alter their values.
  is a man who creates electric signals with his Ether Gear, to perform hypnotic suggestions.
  is a woman who travels between mirrors and manipulates others' reflections through her Ether Gear, .

Ijuna
She uses the Ether Gear  to create red strings that force two people connected by one to fall in love, while cutting the string instills them with murderous hatred for each other. Ijuna first manifests this ability after developing Stockholm syndrome under captivity and torture by Shura, causing her to fall in love with him. Despite Laguna freeing her from her own brainwashing, she remains devoted to Shura and dies together with him in Nero 66's destruction upon realizing their mutual love.

Mashima included the character as the overall winner of an official character design contest held on Twitter between September 26 and October 31, 2020.

Deadend Crow
Crow partners with Ziggy on Lendard in exchange for dominion over the Kaede Cosmos, but is destroyed along with Cure by the Edens Zero with the aid of Cure's teammates.

God Acnoella
Acnoella allies with Ziggy in his conquest of humanity, loaning him , the perpetual motion machine that produces her dragons, to expand his army.

Saintfire Nox
At the beginning of the series, the name belongs to Rebecca's mother and Connor's ex-wife, whom Ziggy captures among numerous human mothers in Universe 3 to extract their Ether and locate Mother. Rachel reunites with Rebecca and Connor after being rescued by the Edens Zero crew, explaining that she left her family to prevent her church's fanatics from killing them due to her forbidden relationship with her husband, having exhausted her ability to reverse time after thousands of attempts to avoid their deaths.

Other characters

Mother

 is the creator of the universe, worshiped by space explorers as the goddess of the cosmos. Mother appears as a gargantuan woman described as being larger than any planet, and is capable of granting any wish to those who find her, causing them to be "born again". Because she exists in the hazardous outer regions of space, she is regarded as a mythical figure within the Sakura Cosmos. Shiki makes it his objective in the series to prove her existence when he is disbelieved for his familiarity with her, later reaffirming his goal as fulfilling Ziggy's dream of finding her.

Xiaomei

 is the series' metafictional narrator, who breaks the fourth wall to provide context and meta-commentary to the story. To avoid boring herself with complete knowledge of the future, she limits her power so that she cannot know the outcome of any battles beyond multiple possibilities, satisfying her obsession for watching combat by putting her visitors through battles as compensation for her knowledge.

Mashima noted that he had to be careful adding Xiaomei into the main storyline due to her conceived role as an omniscient narrator, but found that because she "knows everything in the entire world", he was able to include her "without too much trouble". He added that she had unrevealed backstory and character traits that "may gradually come to light in the future".

Shooting Starlight
 is an adventurers' guild on the planet Blue Garden where members receive passports to different planets. Rebecca and Happy begin as members, with Shiki joining early in the story.

Noah Glenfield

 is the guild master of Shooting Starlight, which serves as his cover as the Galactic Intelligence Agency's Sakura Cosmos branch director. Noah uses the Ether Gear  to observe any non-mechanical being's position across space and time, which leads him to discover Rebecca's time-leaping ability during her childhood. He provides information on the Edens Zero crew to Drakken Joe in a covert plan to use Rebecca's powers against him, after which he reveals his secret identity to the crew to regain their trust.

Labilia Christy

, whose name is derived from the word "lovely", is a guild member and Rebecca's  rival, whose channel is highly popular in the Sakura Cosmos. Depicted as a former friend to Rebecca, whose videos inspired Labilia to become a content creator as a means of coping with a terminal illness, she bullies Rebecca and produces videos mocking her content out of disdain for her lack of talent. Following the three-year time skip, during which her channel loses its popularity, she reconciles with Rebecca and is taken aboard the Edens Zero to be treated for her illness.

Interstellar Union Army
The  is the cosmic government's military and peacekeeping force.

Justice

 is the commanding officer of the commando carrier . Formerly a prince from the planet Lendard named , he vengefully pursues Elsie Crimson, his childhood fiancée, for inciting the war that destroyed their home nation and families; he also antagonizes the Edens Zero crew for their association with her. Like Elsie, Justice uses the Ether Gear "Star Drain" to absorb and manipulate the Ether of planets. He eventually loses his hatred for Elsie after realizing her regret for her actions, and allows himself to be erased from existence with her on Lendard when a chronophage rewinds the planet's time.

The character's design changes when his Ether Gear is active, changing his hair color from white to blue, and creating a pattern of Ether markings around his right eye; Mashima derived these elements from the Rave Master character Sieg Hart, following a "tradition" of using such characters that includes Jellal Fernandes from Fairy Tail. Mashima chose the character's code name to reflect his sense of justice.

Jaguar

Captain  is Justice's superior officer and a reformed member of the Oración Seis Galáctica. He uses an unnamed Ether Gear to assume a humanoid jaguar form. Jaguar is killed by Poseidon Nero during battle against him and Ziggy on the planet Nero 1.

Holy
 is the commanding officer of the battleship  who uses the Ether Gear  to dissolve any person or substance. Holy temporarily allies with the Edens Zero crew to defeat Deadend Crow on Lendard out of revenge for causing a mass murder on her homeworld of Swan that killed her younger sister, abandoning her plans to betray the crew after growing accustomed to them.

Mashima noted Holy's popularity with readers in her early appearances, which he cited as a reason for further developing her character.

Eraser
 is the commanding officer of the commando carrier . His unnamed Ether Gear allows him to erase things from existence by waving his hand in front of them, an ability that requires substantial time to charge, and is limited in its area of effect.

Feather
 is the commander of the army's fastest fleet, which is composed of  class warships.

Cure
 is an android with regenerative powers who commands the battleship . Cure is later revealed to be responsible for the rise of several Galáctica members for the army to defeat, including Drakken Joe, Poseidon Nero, and Deadend Crow, out of an obsession with balance between good and evil. He is destroyed by the Edens Zero after his hidden location within Crow's body is uncovered by Holy.

Madame Kurenai

Originally enslaved in debt after abandoning Homura to amass wealth at the planet's casinos, she rose to power by marrying and assassinating the planet's previous ruler upon being freed by Valkyrie, hiding her selfish nature from her. Kurenai is renounced by Homura and deposed upon being defeated by Shiki, leaving her to be captured by a vengeful man whom she previously disfigured. Three years later, she is revealed to have died in captivity, with Ziggy using her preserved body's Ether to locate Mother.

Xenolith
His prowess allows him to control gravity in conceptual senses, such as "lightening" pain and causing others' thoughts to "fall" into him. The Edens Zero crew encounter Xenolith on Foresta, his home planet in the Aoi Cosmos, where he helps train them to battle Ziggy after the Demon King's resurrection.

Mashima decided on Xenolith's background some time prior to the character's introduction, something the author noted was a rare occurrence in his series.

Reception
In her review of the manga's first volume for Anime News Network (ANN), Amy McNulty praised the trio of Shiki, Rebecca, and Happy, noting that "Rebecca, who initially comes across as vapid, reveals some depth by volume's end", and that Happy "rounds out the trio nicely, though the manga could use more of his humorous commentary throughout to add more levity." ANN's Faye Hopper described Shiki as "more Tarzan than Luffy", feeling that his unambitious goal of exploring the universe and making friends helped enrich the story, though she added that his act of groping Rebecca "really does a number on [Shiki's] likability". In contrast, ANN's Teresa Navarro found Shiki to be archetypal of other shōnen protagonists. Twinfinite's Carlton McGrone praised the characters' designs for being "meticulously sketched and detailed". In a review of the first twelve episodes of the anime, John Serba from Decider considered Shiki and Rebecca to be "very thin characters – naif and non-naif, possibly both quite airheaded – in sincere need of substantial development", and criticized the vague establishment of their goals, but determined them to be "blank slates just [ripe] for whatever the universe throws at them". ANN's MrAJCosplay commented on the series' villains, opining that Mashima's decision to have the series' villains represent "the worst humanity has to offer" was a "double-edged sword"; he considered the majority of villains to be "boring" for their overly simplistic motivations, but noted exceptions such as the "fun sub-villain" Spider, and commented on the setup for Drakken Joe as "[leaning] into a balance of interesting and despicable".

Several reviews for Edens Zero have commented on the characters' similar designs and personalities to those from Hiro Mashima's previous manga Fairy Tail, with comparisons to Natsu Dragneel and Lucy Heartfilia being drawn from Shiki and Rebecca, respectively, while acknowledging that the similarities between characters such as Elsie Crimson and Erza Scarlet, as well as both series' versions of Happy, are intentional. Early online commenters have also likened Shiki's design to that of a "child" of Natsu and Gray Fullbuster. Multiple reviewers felt the tie-ins to Fairy Tail suggested potentially deeper connections between both series. Rebecca Silverman from ANN considered Shiki and Rebecca to be distinct characters from Natsu and Lucy, calling the former "a lot more aware of girls", and the latter "more cautious in her relationships". Ian Wolf from Anime UK News criticized the manga's lack of original designs compared to Fairy Tail, but felt that the similarities would help readers accept the "weirder aspects of the story".

Notes

References

Edens Zero manga
Entire series
 Mashima, Hiro. Edens Zero. 20 vols. New York City: Kodansha USA, 2018–present.
 Mashima, Hiro.  [Edens Zero] (in Japanese). 25 vols. Tokyo: Kodansha, 2018–present.

Individual volumes

Other sources

External links
 

Edens Zero